Chalkstick fractures are fractures, typically of long bones, in which the fracture is transverse to the long axis of the bone, like a broken stick of chalk. A healthy long bone typically breaks like a hard woody stick as the collagen in the matrix adds remarkable flexibility to the mineral and the energy can run up and down the growth rings of bone. The bones of children will even follow a greenstick fracture pattern.

Chalkstick fractures are particularly common in Paget's disease of bone, and osteopetrosis. It is also seen in cases of fused spine as in a patient with ankylosing spondylitis.

References

Bone fractures